This article lists the winners and nominees for the NAACP Image Award for Outstanding Independent Motion Picture.

History
This award has been given since 2005.

Winners and nominees
Winners are listed first and highlighted in bold.

2000s

2010s

2020s

References

NAACP Image Awards
Awards established in 2005